Serbia participated in the Eurovision Song Contest 2010 with the song "Ovo je Balkan" written by Goran Bregović, Marina Tucaković and Ljiljana Jorgovanović. The song was performed by Milan Stanković. The Serbian national broadcaster, Radio Television of Serbia (RTS) organised the national final Tri pa jedan za Oslo in order to select the Serbian entry for the 2010 contest in Oslo, Norway. Goran Bregović was selected to compose three songs for the national final on 13 March 2010, which resulted in "Ovo je Balkan" performed by Milan Stanković as the winner entirely by a public televote.

Serbia was drawn to compete in the first semi-final of the Eurovision Song Contest which took place on 25 May 2010. Performing during the show in position 7, "Ovo je Balkan" was announced among the top 10 entries of the first semi-final and therefore qualified to compete in the final on 29 May. It was later revealed that Serbia placed fifth out of the 17 participating countries in the semi-final with 79 points. In the final, Serbia performed in position 8 and placed thirteenth out of the 25 participating countries, scoring 72 points.

Background 

Since 2007, two out of three of Serbia's entries have featured in the final with Serbia's 2009 entry "Cipela" performed by Marko Kon and Milaan failing to qualify Serbia to the final.

The Serbian national broadcaster, Radio Television of Serbia (RTS), broadcasts the event within Serbia and organises the selection process for the nation's entry. RTS confirmed their intentions to participate at the 2010 Eurovision Song Contest on 8 November 2009. It was reported in late November 2009 that the broadcaster were in discussions to shift their selection strategy following ongoing controversy over the Beovizija national final used since 2007 and their 2009 entry failing to qualify Serbia to the final. In the event that RTS internally selected the Serbian entry, the rock band Negative would represent Serbia after lead vocalist Ivana Peters stated that they would represent the nation only if a different selection method was introduced.

Before Eurovision

Tri pa jedan za Oslo 
Tri pa jedan za Oslo (Three and then one for Oslo) was the national final organised by RTS in order to select the Serbian entry for the Eurovision Song Contest 2010. The selection was held on 13 March 2010, hosted by Maja Nikolić and broadcast on RTS1, RTS Sat, via radio on Radio Belgrade 1 as well as streamed online via the broadcaster's website rts.rs.

Artists selection 
RTS announced during a press conference on 19 January 2010 that musician Goran Bregović would compose three songs for the national final. The songs were written by lyricists Marina Tucaković and Ljiljana Jorgovanović. Goran Bregović invited ten candidates to auditions that were held in Belgrade between 16 and 18 February 2010: Adil Maksutović, Emina Jahović, Jelena Marković, Marija Lazić, Marko Vulinović, Milan Stanković, Minja Samardžić, Nenad Ćeranić, Oliver Katić and Željko Vasić. Following consultation with RTS, Bregović selected Emina Jahović, Milan Stanković and Oliver Katić with Jelena Marković to proceed to the national final.

Final 
The final took place at the studios of RTS in Košutnjak, Belgrade on 13 March 2010 where three songs competed. The winner, "Ovo je Balkan" performed by Milan Stanković, was decided exclusively by the Serbian public via SMS voting. Former Eurovision contestants Severina, who represented Croatia in 2006, Marija Šerifović, who won the contest for Serbia in 2007, Jelena Tomašević, who represented Serbia in 2008, Marko Kon, who represented Serbia in 2009, Regina, who represented Bosnia in 2009, singer Zdravko Čolić, and Goran Bregović's Wedding and Funeral Orchestra were featured as guest performers during the show.

At Eurovision

According to Eurovision rules, all nations with the exceptions of the host country and the "Big Four" (France, Germany, Spain and the United Kingdom) are required to qualify from one of two semi-finals in order to compete for the final; the top ten countries from each semi-final progress to the final. The European Broadcasting Union (EBU) split up the competing countries into six different pots based on voting patterns from previous contests, with countries with favourable voting histories put into the same pot. On 7 February 2010, a special allocation draw was held which placed each country into one of the two semi-finals, as well as which half of the show they would perform in. Serbia was placed into the first semi-final, to be held on 25 May 2010, and was scheduled to perform in the first half of the show. The running order for the semi-finals was decided through another draw on 23 March 2010 and Serbia was set to perform in position 7, following the entry from Latvia and before the entry from Bosnia and Herzegovina.

The two semi-finals and the final were broadcast in Serbia on RTS1 and RTS Sat with commentary for the second semi-final by Dragan Ilić and commentary for the first semi-final and final by Duška Vučinić-Lučić. The Serbian spokesperson, who announced the Serbian votes during the final, was Maja Nikolić.

Ahead of the contest, Stanković recorded a Spanish version of his contest entry, entitled "Balkañeros", which was released publicly on 11 April 2010.

Semi-final 

Milan Stanković took part in technical rehearsals on 16 and 20 May, followed by dress rehearsals on 24 and 25 May. This included the jury show on 24 May where the professional juries of each country watched and voted on the competing entries.

The Serbian performance featured Milan Stanković performing a choreographed routine in a blue jeweled outfit together with two male dancers in blue sequined outfits and two female backing vocalists in white dresses made out of bubble wrap. The performance began with Stanković and the dancers hiding behind half transparent screens on round podiums, which Stanković then appeared in front and joined by the backing performers. Silver bubbles were hanging from the ceiling with the stage lighting predominately displaying red colours. The performance also made use of the stage's silver bubbles and featured pyrotechnic effects. The two dancers that joined Milan Stanković on stage were: Aleksandar Jelenković and Marko Stojiljković, while the two backing vocalists were: Saška Janković and Zorica Brkić.

At the end of the show, Serbia was announced as having finished in the top 10 and subsequently qualifying for the grand final. It was later revealed that Serbia placed fifth in the semi-final, receiving a total of 72 points.

Final 
Shortly after the first semi-final, a winners' press conference was held for the ten qualifying countries. As part of this press conference, the qualifying artists took part in a draw to determine the running order for the final. This draw was done in the order the countries were announced during the semi-final. Serbia was drawn to perform in position 8, following the entry from Belgium and before the entry from Belarus.

Milan Stanković once again took part in dress rehearsals on 28 and 29 May before the final, including the jury final where the professional juries cast their final votes before the live show. Milan Stanković performed a repeat of his semi-final performance during the final on 29 May. Serbia placed thirteenth in the final, scoring 72 points.

Voting 
Voting during the three shows consisted of 50 percent public televoting and 50 percent from a jury deliberation. The jury consisted of five music industry professionals who were citizens of the country they represent. This jury was asked to judge each contestant based on: vocal capacity; the stage performance; the song's composition and originality; and the overall impression by the act. In addition, no member of a national jury could be related in any way to any of the competing acts in such a way that they cannot vote impartially and independently.

Following the release of the full split voting by the EBU after the conclusion of the competition, it was revealed that Serbia had placed tenth with the public televote and twenty-first with the jury vote in the final. In the public vote, Serbia scored 110 points, while with the jury vote, Serbia scored 37 points. In the first semi-final, Serbia placed fifth with the public televote with 92 points and eighth with the jury vote, scoring 65 points.

Below is a breakdown of points awarded to Serbia and awarded by Serbia in the first semi-final and grand final of the contest. The nation awarded its 12 points to Bosnia and Herzegovina in the semi-final and the final of the contest.

Points awarded to Serbia

Points awarded by Serbia

References

2010
Countries in the Eurovision Song Contest 2010
Eurovision